A stalemate in chess occurs when the player whose turn it is to move is not in check but has no legal move, resulting in the game being a draw.

Stalemate may also refer to:
 Draw (tie), a result in competitions where there is either no winner or multiple winners
 Impasse, in bargaining
 Political stalemate, when competing political forces prevent each other from acting
 Operation Stalemate, Battle of Peleliu in 1944 in the Pacific Theater of World War II

Music
 Stalemate (Fela Kuti album), 1977
 Stalemate (SMP album), 1995
Stalemate (EP), a 1994 EP by SMP

Songs
"Stalemate", by Neurosis from Pain of Mind, 1987
"Stalemate", by Limp Bizkit from Three Dollar Bill, Y'all, 1997
"Stalemate", by Katatonia from Discouraged Ones, 1998
"Stalemate", by Soilwork from Stabbing the Drama, 2005
 "Stalemate" (song), by Ben's Brother, 2009
"Stalemate", by Enter Shikari from A Flash Flood of Colour, 2012
"Stalemate", by Io Echo from Ministry of Love, 2013
"Stalemate", by Marc Martel from Impersonator, 2014
"Stalemate", by Frank Wildhorn from Death Note: The Musical, 2015
"Stalemate", by The Story So Far from The Story So Far, 2015

See also
 Deadlock (disambiguation)
 Gridlock (disambiguation)